Senator Drayton may refer to:

John Drayton (1766–1822), South Carolina State Senate
Thomas Drayton (1809–1891), South Carolina State Senate